Cropia is a genus of moths of the family Noctuidae. The genus was erected by Francis Walker in 1858.

Species
 Cropia albiclava Draudt, 1925
 Cropia aleuca Hampson, 1908
 Cropia carnitincta Hampson, 1908
 Cropia cedica (Stoll, [1782])
 Cropia connecta (Smith, 1894)
 Cropia consonens Dyar, 1910
 Cropia europs Dyar, 1910
 Cropia grandimacula (Schaus, 1911)
 Cropia hadenoides Walker, [1858]
 Cropia indigna (Walker, [1858])
 Cropia infusa (Walker, [1858])
 Cropia isidora Dyar, 1910
 Cropia leucodonta Hampson, 1911
 Cropia minthe (Druce, 1889)
 Cropia perfusa Dyar, 1910
 Cropia phila (Druce, 1889)
 Cropia philosopha Schaus, 1911
 Cropia plumbicincta Hampson, 1908
 Cropia poliomera E. D. Jones, 1908
 Cropia ruthaea Dyar, 1910
 Cropia sigrida Schaus, 1933
 Cropia subapicalis (Walker, [1858])
 Cropia submarginalis Schaus, 1911
 Cropia templada (Schaus, 1906)
 Cropia tessellata (Sepp, [1840])

References

Hadeninae